Admiral Sands may refer to:

Benjamin F. Sands (1811–1883), U.S. Navy rear admiral
James H. Sands (1845–1911), U.S. Navy rear admiral
Joshua R. Sands (1795–1883), U.S. Navy rear admiral
Milton Sands III (fl. 1990s–2020s), U.S. Navy rear admiral